Tom Nijssen and Cyril Suk were the defending champions, but were forced to withdraw before their quarter-final match against Scott Melville and Piet Norval.

Melville and Norval won the title by defeating Jacco Eltingh and Paul Haarhuis 7–6, 7–5 in the final.

Seeds
All seeds seeds received a bye into the second round.

Draw

Finals

Top half

Bottom half

References

External links
 Official results archive (ATP)
 Official results archive (ITF)

Doubles 1994
Mercedes Cup Doubles